Diane Keaton (born Diane Hall, January 5, 1946) is an American actress. She has received various accolades throughout her career spanning over six decades, including an Academy Award, a British Academy Film Award, two Golden Globe Awards. She was honored with the Film Society of Lincoln Center Gala Tribute in 2007 and an AFI Life Achievement Award in 2017.

Keaton's career began on stage when she appeared in the original 1968 Broadway production of the musical Hair.  The next year she was nominated for a Tony Award for Best Featured Actress in a Play for her performance in Woody Allen's comic play Play it Again, Sam. She then made her screen debut in a small role in Lovers and Other Strangers (1970), before rising to prominence with her first major film role as Kay Adams-Corleone in Francis Ford Coppola's The Godfather (1972), a role she reprised in its sequels Part II (1974) and Part III (1990). She frequently collaborated with Woody Allen, beginning with the film adaptation of Play It Again, Sam (1972). Her next two films with him, Sleeper (1973) and Love and Death (1975), established her as a comic actor, while her fourth, Annie Hall (1977), won her the Academy Award for Best Actress.

To avoid being typecast as her Annie Hall persona, Keaton appeared in several dramatic films, starring in Looking for Mr. Goodbar (1977) and Interiors (1978). She received three more Academy Award nominations for her roles as activist Louise Bryant in Reds (1981), a leukemia patient in Marvin's Room (1996), and a dramatist in Something's Gotta Give (2003).

Early life and education 
Keaton was born Diane Hall in Los Angeles, California on January 5, 1946. Her mother, Dorothy Deanne (née Keaton), was a homemaker and amateur photographer; her father, John Newton Ignatius "Jack" Hall, was a real estate broker and civil engineer. Keaton was raised a Free Methodist by her mother. Her mother won the "Mrs. Los Angeles" pageant for homemakers; Keaton has said that the theatricality of the event inspired her first impulse to be an actress, and led to her desire to work on stage. She has also credited Katharine Hepburn, whom she admires for playing strong and independent women, as one of her inspirations.

Keaton is a 1964 graduate of Santa Ana High School in Santa Ana, California. During her time there, she participated in singing and acting clubs at school, and starred as Blanche DuBois in a school production of A Streetcar Named Desire. After graduation, she attended Santa Ana College, and later Orange Coast College as an acting student, but dropped out after a year to pursue an entertainment career in Manhattan. Upon joining the Actors' Equity Association, she changed her surname to Keaton, which was her mother's maiden name, as there was already an actress registered under the name of Diane Hall. For a brief time she also moonlighted at nightclubs with a singing act. She revisited her nightclub act in Annie Hall (1977), And So It Goes (2014), and a cameo in Radio Days (1987).

Keaton began studying acting at the Neighborhood Playhouse in New York City.And moved into the famed Rehearsal Club. She initially studied acting under the Meisner technique, an ensemble acting technique first evolved in the 1930s by Sanford Meisner, a New York stage actor/acting coach/director who had been a member of The Group Theater (1931–1940). She describes her acting technique as, "[being] only as good as the person you're acting with ... As opposed to going it on my own and forging my path to create a wonderful performance without the help of anyone. I always need the help of everyone!" According to fellow actor Jack Nicholson, "She approaches a script sort of like a play in that she has the entire script memorized before you start doing the movie, which I don't know any other actors doing that."

Career

1970s 
In 1968, Keaton became a member of the "Tribe" and understudy to Sheila in the original Broadway production of Hair. She gained some notoriety for her refusal to disrobe at the end of Act I when the cast performs nude, even though nudity in the production was optional for actors (Those who performed nude received a $50 bonus). After acting in Hair for nine months, she auditioned for a part in Woody Allen's production of Play It Again, Sam. She went on to receive a Tony Award nomination for a Best Featured Actress in a Play for her performance in Play It Again, Sam.

The next year, Keaton made her film debut in Lovers and Other Strangers. She followed with guest roles on the television series Love, American Style, Night Gallery, and Mannix. Between films, Keaton appeared in a series of deodorant commercials.

Keaton's breakthrough role came two years later when she was cast as Kay Adams, the girlfriend and eventual wife of Michael Corleone (played by Al Pacino) in Francis Ford Coppola's 1972 film The Godfather. Coppola noted that he first noticed Keaton in Lovers and Other Strangers, and cast her because of her reputation for eccentricity that he wanted her to bring to the role (Keaton claims that at the time she was commonly referred to as "the kooky actress" of the film industry). Her performance in the film was loosely based on her real-life experience of making the film, both of which she has described as being "the woman in a world of men." The Godfather was an unparalleled critical and financial success, becoming the highest-grossing film of the year and winning the Best Picture Oscar of 1972.

Two years later she reprised her role as Kay Adams in The Godfather Part II. She was initially reluctant, saying, "At first, I was skeptical about playing Kay again in the Godfather sequel. But when I read the script, the character seemed much more substantial than in the first movie." In Part II, her character changed dramatically, becoming more embittered about her husband's criminal empire. Even though Keaton received widespread exposure from the films, some critics felt that her character's importance was minimal. Time wrote that she was "invisible in The Godfather and pallid in The Godfather, Part II, but according to Empire magazine, Keaton "proves the quiet lynchpin which is no mean feat in [the] necessarily male dominated films."

Keaton's other notable films of the 1970s included many collaborations with Woody Allen. She played many eccentric characters in several of his comic and dramatic films, including Sleeper, Love and Death, Interiors, Manhattan, Manhattan Murder Mystery and the film version of Play It Again, Sam, directed by Herbert Ross. Allen has credited Keaton as his muse during his early film career.

In 1977 Keaton won the Academy Award for Best Actress in Allen's romantic comedy Annie Hall, one of her most famous roles. Annie Hall, written by Allen and Marshall Brickman and directed by Allen, was believed by many to be an autobiographical exploration of his relationship with Keaton. Allen based the character of Annie Hall loosely on Keaton ("Annie" is a nickname of hers, and "Hall" is her original surname). Many of Keaton's mannerisms and her self-deprecating sense of humor were added into the role by Allen. (Director Nancy Meyers has claimed: "Diane's the most self-deprecating person alive.") Keaton has also said that Allen wrote the character as an "idealized version" of herself. The two starred as a frequently on-again, off-again couple living in New York City. Her acting was later summed up by CNN as "awkward, self-deprecating, speaking in endearing little whirlwinds of semi-logic", and by Allen as a "nervous breakdown in slow motion." The film was both a major financial and critical success and won the Academy Award for Best Picture. Of Keaton's performance, feminist film critic Molly Haskell wrote, "Keaton took me by surprise in Annie Hall. Here she blossomed into something more than just another kooky dame—she put the finishing touches on a type, the anti-goddess, the golden shiksa from the provinces who looks cool and together, who looks as if she must have a date on Saturday night, but has only to open her mouth or gulp or dart spastically sideways to reveal herself as the insecure bungler she is, as complete a social disaster in her own way as Allen's horny West Side intellectual is in his." In 2006 Premiere magazine ranked Keaton in Annie Hall 60th on its list of the "100 Greatest Performances of All Time", and noted:

It's hard to play ditzy. ... The genius of Annie is that despite her loopy backhand, awful driving, and nervous tics, she's also a complicated, intelligent woman. Keaton brilliantly displays this dichotomy of her character, especially when she yammers away on a first date with Alvy (Woody Allen), while the subtitle reads, 'He probably thinks I'm a yoyo.' Yo-yo? Hardly.

Keaton's eccentric wardrobe in Annie Hall, which consisted mainly of vintage men's clothing, including neckties, vests, baggy pants, and fedora hats, made her an unlikely fashion icon of the late 1970s. A small amount of the clothing seen in the film came from Keaton herself, who was already known for her tomboyish clothing style years before Annie Hall, and Ruth Morley designed the movie's costumes. Soon after the film's release, men's clothing and pantsuits became popular attire for women. She is known to favor men's vintage clothing, and usually appears in public wearing gloves and conservative attire. (A 2005 profile in the San Francisco Chronicle described her as "easy to find. Look for the only woman in sight dressed in a turtleneck. On a 90-degree afternoon in Pasadena.")

Her photo by Douglas Kirkland appeared on the cover of the September 26, 1977, issue of Time magazine, with the story dubbing her "the funniest woman now working in films." Later that year she departed from her usual lighthearted comic roles when she won the highly coveted lead role in the drama Looking for Mr. Goodbar, based on the novel by Judith Rossner. In the film she played a Catholic schoolteacher for deaf children who lives a double life, spending nights frequenting singles bars and engaging in promiscuous sex. Keaton became interested in the role after seeing it as a "psychological case history." The same issue of Time commended her role choice and criticized the restricted roles available for female actors in American films: A male actor can fly a plane, fight a war, shoot a badman, pull off a sting, impersonate a big cheese in business or politics. Men are presumed to be interesting. A female can play a wife, play a whore, get pregnant, lose her baby, and, um, let's see ... Women are presumed to be dull. ... Now a determined trend spotter can point to a handful of new films whose makers think that women can bear the dramatic weight of a production alone, or virtually so. Then there is Diane Keaton in Looking for Mr. Goodbar. As Theresa Dunn, Keaton dominates this raunchy, risky, violent dramatization of Judith Rossner's 1975 novel about a schoolteacher who cruises singles bars.

In addition to acting, Keaton has said she "had a lifelong ambition to be a singer." She had a brief, unrealized career as a recording artist in the 1970s. Her first record was an original cast recording of Hair, in 1971. In 1977 she began recording tracks for a solo album, but the finished record never materialized.

Keaton met with more success in the medium of still photography. Like her character in Annie Hall, Keaton had long relished photography as a favorite hobby, an interest she picked up as a teenager from her mother. While traveling in the late 1970s, she began exploring her avocation more seriously. "Rolling Stone had asked me to take photographs for them, and I thought, 'Wait a minute, what I'm really interested in is these lobbies, and these strange ballrooms in these old hotels.' So I began shooting them", she recalled in 2003. "These places were deserted, and I could just sneak in anytime and nobody cared. It was so easy and I could do it myself. It was an adventure for me." Reservations, her collection of photos of hotel interiors, was published in book form in 1980.

1980s 

With Manhattan (1979), Keaton and Woody Allen ended their long working relationship; it was their last major collaboration until 1993. In 1978 she became romantically involved with Warren Beatty, and two years later he cast her opposite him in the epic historical drama Reds. In the film, she played Louise Bryant, a journalist and feminist, who flees her husband to work with radical journalist John Reed (Beatty) and later enters Russia to find him as he chronicles the Russian Civil War. Beatty cast Keaton after seeing her in Annie Hall, as he wanted to bring her natural nervousness and insecure attitude to the role. The production of Reds was delayed several times following its conception in 1977, and Keaton almost left the project when she believed it would never be produced. Filming finally began two years later. 

In a 2006 Vanity Fair story, Keaton described her role as "the everyman of that piece, as someone who wanted to be extraordinary but was probably more ordinary ... I knew what it felt like to be extremely insecure." Assistant director Simon Relph later stated that Louise Bryant was one of Keaton's most difficult roles, and that "[she] almost got broken." Reds opened to critical acclaim, and Keaton's performance was particularly praised. The New York Times wrote that Keaton was "nothing less than splendid as Louise Bryant– beautiful, selfish, funny and driven. It's the best work she has done to date." Roger Ebert called Keaton "a particular surprise. I had somehow gotten into the habit of expecting her to be a touchy New Yorker, sweet, scared, and intellectual. Here, she is just what she needs to be: plucky, healthy, exasperated, loyal, and funny." Keaton received her second Academy Award nomination for her performance.

The following year, Keaton starred in the domestic drama Shoot the Moon opposite Albert Finney. The film follows George (Finney) and Faith Dunlap (Keaton), whose deteriorating marriage, separation, and love affairs devastate their four children. Shoot the Moon received mostly positive reviews from critics and Keaton's performance was again praised. In The New Yorker, Pauline Kael wrote that the film was "perhaps the most revealing American movie of the era", saying of Keaton:

Diane Keaton may be a star without vanity: she's so completely challenged by the role of Faith that all she cares about is getting the character right. Very few young American movie actresses have the strength and the instinct for the toughest dramatic roles — intelligent, sophisticated heroines. Jane Fonda did, around the time that she appeared in Klute and They Shoot Horses, Don't They?, but that was more than ten years ago. There hasn't been anybody else until now. Diane Keaton acts on a different plane from that of her previous film roles; she brings the character a full measure of dread and awareness and does it in a special, intuitive way that's right for screen acting.

David Denby of New York magazine called Keaton "perfectly relaxed and self-assured", adding, "Keaton has always found it easy enough to bring out the anger that lies beneath the soft hesitancy of her surface manner, but she's never dug down and found this much pain before. Keaton's performance garnered her a second Golden Globe nomination in a row for Best Actress in a Motion Picture – Drama, following Reds.

1984 brought The Little Drummer Girl, Keaton's first excursion into the thriller and action genre. The Little Drummer Girl was both a financial and critical failure, with critics claiming that Keaton was miscast for the genre, such as one review from The New Republic claiming that "the title role, the pivotal role, is played by Diane Keaton, and around her the picture collapses in tatters. She is so feeble, so inappropriate." But the same year she received positive reviews for her performance in Mrs. Soffel, a film based on the true story of a repressed prison warden's wife who falls in love with a convicted murderer and arranges for his escape. Two years later she starred with Jessica Lange and Sissy Spacek in Crimes of the Heart, adapted from Beth Henley's Pulitzer Prize-winning play into a moderately successful screen comedy. Keaton's performance was well received by critics, and Rita Kempley of The Washington Post wrote, "As the frumpy Lenny, Keaton eases smoothly from New York neurotic to southern eccentric, a reluctant wallflower stymied by, of all things, her shriveled ovary."

In 1987 Keaton starred in Baby Boom, her first of four collaborations with writer-producer Nancy Meyers. She played a Manhattan career woman who is suddenly forced to care for a toddler. A modest box-office success, Keaton's performance was singled out by Kael, who described it as "a glorious comedy performance that rides over many of the inanities in this picture. Keaton is smashing: the Tiger Lady's having all this drive is played for farce and Keaton keeps you alert to every shade of pride and panic the character feels. She's an ultra-feminine executive, a wide-eyed charmer, with a breathless ditziness that may remind you of Jean Arthur in The More The Merrier." That same year Keaton made a cameo in Allen's film Radio Days as a nightclub singer. 1988's The Good Mother was a financial disappointment (according to Keaton, the film was "a Big Failure. Like, BIG failure"), and some critics panned her performance; according to The Washington Post, "her acting degenerates into hype—as if she's trying to sell an idea she can't fully believe in."

In 1987 Keaton directed and edited her first feature film, Heaven, a documentary about the possibility of an afterlife. It met with mixed critical reaction, with The New York Times likening it to "a conceit imposed on its subjects." Over the next four years Keaton directed music videos for artists such as Belinda Carlisle, including the video for Carlisle's chart-topping hit "Heaven Is a Place on Earth," two television films starring Patricia Arquette, and episodes of the series China Beach and Twin Peaks.

1990s 
By the 1990s Keaton had established herself as one of the most popular and versatile actors in Hollywood. She shifted to more mature roles, frequently playing matriarchs of middle-class families. Of her role choices and avoidance of becoming typecast, she said: "Most often a particular role does you some good and Bang! You have loads of offers, all of them for similar roles ... I have tried to break away from the usual roles and have tried my hand at several things."

Keaton began the decade with The Lemon Sisters, a poorly received comedy/drama that she starred in and produced, which was shelved for a year after its completion. In 1991 she starred with Steve Martin in the family comedy Father of the Bride. She was almost not cast in the film, as The Good Mother's commercial failure had strained her relationship with Walt Disney Pictures, the studio of both films. Father of the Bride was Keaton's first major hit after four years of commercial disappointments. She reprised her role four years later in the sequel, as a woman who becomes pregnant in middle age at the same time as her daughter. A San Francisco Examiner review of the film was one of many in which Keaton was once again compared to Katharine Hepburn: "No longer relying on that stuttering uncertainty that seeped into all her characterizations of the 1970s, she has somehow become Katharine Hepburn with a deep maternal instinct, that is, she is a fine and intelligent actress who doesn't need to be tough and edgy in order to prove her feminism."

Keaton reprised her role of Kay Adams in 1990's The Godfather Part III, set 20 years after the end of The Godfather, Part II. In 1993 Keaton starred in Manhattan Murder Mystery, her first major film role in a Woody Allen film since 1979. Her part was originally intended for Mia Farrow, but Farrow dropped out of the project after breaking up with Allen. Todd McCarthy of Variety commended her performance, writing that she "nicely handles her sometimes buffoonish central comedic role". David Ansen of Newsweek wrote, "On screen, Keaton and Allen have always been made for each other: they still strike wonderfully ditsy sparks". For her performance, Keaton was nominated for a Golden Globe Award for Best Actress – Motion Picture Comedy or Musical.

In 1995 Keaton directed Unstrung Heroes, her first theatrically released narrative film. The movie, adapted from Franz Lidz's memoir, starred Nathan Watt as a boy in the 1960s whose mother (Andie MacDowell) is diagnosed with cancer. As her sickness advances and his inventor father (John Turturro) grows increasingly distant, the boy is sent to live with his two eccentric uncles (Maury Chaykin and Michael Richards). Keaton switched the story's setting from the New York of Lidz's book to the Southern California of her own childhood, and the four mad uncles were reduced to a whimsical odd couple. In an essay for The New York Times, Lidz said that the cinematic Selma had died not of cancer, but of "Old Movie Disease". "Someday somebody may find a cure for cancer, but the terminal sappiness of cancer movies is probably beyond remedy." Unstrung Heroes played in a relatively limited release and made little impression at the box office, but the film and its direction were generally well-received critically.

Keaton's most successful film of the decade was the 1996 comedy The First Wives Club. She starred with Goldie Hawn and Bette Midler as a trio of "first wives": middle-aged women who had been divorced by their husbands in favor of younger women. Keaton claimed that making the film "saved [her] life." The film was a major success, grossing US$105million at the North American box office, and it developed a cult following among middle-aged women. Its reviews were generally positive for Keaton and her co-stars, and The San Francisco Chronicle called her "probably [one of] the best comic film actresses alive." In 1997 Keaton, Hawn and Midler received the Women in Film Crystal Award, which honors "outstanding women who, through their endurance and the excellence of their work, have helped to expand the role of women within the entertainment industry."

Also in 1996 Keaton starred as Bessie, a woman with leukemia, in Marvin's Room, an adaptation of the play by Scott McPherson. Meryl Streep played her estranged sister, Lee, and had also initially been considered for the role of Bessie. The film also starred Leonardo DiCaprio as Lee's rebellious son. Roger Ebert wrote, "Streep and Keaton, in their different styles, find ways to make Lee and Bessie into much more than the expression of their problems." Keaton earned a third Academy Award nomination for the film, which was critically acclaimed. She said the role's biggest challenge was understanding the mentality of a person with a terminal illness. Keaton next starred in The Only Thrill (1997) opposite her Baby Boom co-star Sam Shephard, and had a supporting role in The Other Sister (1999).

In 1999 Keaton narrated the one-hour public radio documentary "If I Get Out Alive", the first to focus on the conditions and brutality young people face in the adult correctional system. The program, produced by Lichtenstein Creative Media, aired on public radio stations across the country and was honored with a First Place National Headliner Award and a Casey Medal for Meritorious Journalism.

2000s 
Keaton's first film of 2000 was Hanging Up, with Meg Ryan and Lisa Kudrow. She directed the film, despite claiming in a 1996 interview that she would never direct herself in a film, saying "as a director, you automatically have different goals. I can't think about directing when I'm acting." A drama about three sisters coping with the senility and eventual death of their elderly father (Walter Matthau), Hanging Up rated poorly with critics and grossed a modest US$36million at the North American box office.

In 2001 Keaton co-starred with Warren Beatty in Town & Country, a critical and financial fiasco. Budgeted at an estimated US$90million, the film opened to little notice and grossed only US$7million in its North American theatrical run. Peter Travers of Rolling Stone wrote that Town & Country was "less deserving of a review than it is an obituary....The corpse took with it the reputations of its starry cast, including Warren Beatty and Diane Keaton." In 2001 and 2002 Keaton starred in four low-budget television films. She played a fanatical nun in the religious drama Sister Mary Explains It All, an impoverished mother in the drama On Thin Ice, and a bookkeeper in the mob comedy Plan B. In Crossed Over, she played Beverly Lowry, a woman who forms an unusual friendship with the only woman executed while on death row in Texas, Karla Faye Tucker.

Keaton's first major hit since 1996 came in 2003's Something's Gotta Give, directed by Nancy Meyers and co-starring Jack Nicholson. Nicholson and Keaton, aged 65 and 56 respectively, were seen as bold casting choices for leads in a romantic comedy. Twentieth Century Fox, the film's original studio, reportedly declined to produce the film, fearing that the lead characters were too old to be bankable. Keaton told Ladies' Home Journal, "Let's face it, people my age and Jack's age are much deeper, much more soulful, because they've seen a lot of life. They have a great deal of passion and hope—why shouldn't they fall in love? Why shouldn't movies show that?" Keaton played a middle-aged playwright who falls in love with her daughter's much older boyfriend. The film was a major success at the box office, grossing US$125million in North America. Roger Ebert wrote, "Nicholson and Keaton bring so much experience, knowledge and humor to their characters that the film works in ways the screenplay might not have even hoped for." Keaton received her fourth Academy Award nomination for her performance.

Keaton's only film between 2004 and 2006 was the comedy The Family Stone (2005), starring an ensemble cast. In the film, scripted and directed by Thomas Bezucha, Keaton played a breast cancer survivor and matriarch of a big New England family that reunites at the parents' home for its annual Christmas holidays. The film was released to moderate critical and commercial success, and earned US$92.2million worldwide. Keaton received her second Satellite Award nomination for her portrayal, of which Peter Travers of Rolling Stone wrote, "Keaton, a sorceress at blending humor and heartbreak, honors the film with a grace that makes it stick in the memory."

In 2007 Keaton starred in both Because I Said So and Mama's Boy. In the romantic comedy Because I Said So, directed by Michael Lehmann, Keaton played a long-divorced mother of three daughters, determined to pair off her only single daughter, Milly (Mandy Moore). Also starring Stephen Collins and Gabriel Macht, the project opened to overwhelmingly negative reviews, with Wesley Morris of The Boston Globe calling it "a sloppily made bowl of reheated chick-flick cliches", and was ranked among the worst-reviewed films of the year. The following year Keaton received her first and only Golden Raspberry Award nomination to date for the film. In Mama's Boy, director Tim Hamilton's feature film debut, Keaton starred as the mother of a self-absorbed 29-year-old (Jon Heder) whose world turns upside down when she starts dating and considers kicking him out of the house. Distributed for a limited release to certain parts of the United States only, the independent comedy garnered largely negative reviews.

In 2008 Keaton starred alongside Dax Shepard and Liv Tyler in Vince Di Meglio's dramedy Smother, playing the overbearing mother of an unemployed therapist, who decides to move in with him and his girlfriend after breaking up with her husband (Ken Howard). As with Mama's Boy, the film received a limited release only, resulting in a gross of US$1.8million worldwide. Critical reaction to the film was generally unfavorable, and once again Keaton was dismissed for her role choices, with Sandra Hall of the New York Post writing, "Diane's career is dyin' [...] this time, sadly, she's gone too far. She's turned herself into a mother-in-law joke." Also in 2008 Keaton appeared alongside Katie Holmes and Queen Latifah in the crime-comedy film Mad Money, directed by Callie Khouri. Based on the British television drama Hot Money (2001), the film revolves around three female employees of the Federal Reserve who scheme to steal money that is about to be destroyed. As with Keaton's previous projects, the film bombed at the box offices with a gross total of US$26.4million, and was universally panned, ranking third in the New York Post Top 10 Worst Movies of 2008.

2010s 
In 2010 Keaton starred alongside Rachel McAdams and Harrison Ford in Roger Michell's comedy Morning Glory, playing the veteran TV host of a fictional morning talk show that desperately needs to boost its lagging ratings. Portraying a narcissistic character who will do anything to please the audience, Keaton described her role as "the kind of woman you love to hate." Inspired by Neil Simon's 1972 Broadway play The Sunshine Boys, the film was a moderate success at the box office, taking a worldwide total of almost US$59million. Some critics felt that Keaton was underused in the film, but she was generally praised for her performance, with James Berardinelli of ReelViews writing, "Diane Keaton is so good at her part that one can see her sliding effortlessly into an anchor's chair on a real morning show."

In fall 2010 Keaton joined the production of the comedy drama Darling Companion by Lawrence Kasdan, which was released in 2012. Co-starring Kevin Kline and Dianne Wiest and set in Telluride, Colorado, the film follows a woman, played by Keaton, whose husband loses her much-beloved dog at a wedding held at their vacation home in the Rocky Mountains, resulting in a search party to find the pet. Kasdan's first film in nine years, the film bombed at the US box office, where it scored about US$790,000 throughout its entire theatrical run. Critics dismissed the film as "an overwritten, underplotted vanity project" but applauded Keaton's performance. Ty Burr of The Boston Globe wrote that the film "would be instantly forgettable if not for Keaton, who imbues [her role] with a sorrow, warmth, wisdom, and rage that feel earned [...] Her performance here is an extension of worn, resilient grace."

Also in 2011 Keaton began production on Justin Zackham's 2013 ensemble comedy The Big Wedding, a remake of the 2006 French film Mon frère se marie in which she, along with Robert De Niro, played a long-divorced couple who, for the sake of their adopted son's wedding and his very religious biological mother, pretend they are still married. The film received largely negative reviews. In his New York Post review Lou Lumenick wrote, "the brutally unfunny, cringe-worthy The Big Wedding provides ample opportunities for Robert De Niro, Diane Keaton, Susan Sarandon, and Robin Williams to embarrass themselves".

In 2014 Keaton starred in And So It Goes and 5 Flights Up. In Rob Reiner's romantic dramedy And So It Goes, Keaton portrayed a widowed lounge singer who finds autumnal love with a bad boy (Michael Douglas). The film received largely negative reviews. One critic wrote that "And So It Goes aims for comedy, but with two talented actors stuck in a half-hearted effort from a once-mighty filmmaker, it ends in unintentional tragedy." Keaton co-starred with Morgan Freeman in Richard Loncraine's comedy film 5 Flights Up, based on Jill Ciment's novel Heroic Measures. They play a long-married couple who have an eventful weekend after they are forced to contemplate selling their beloved Brooklyn apartment. Shot in New York, the film premiered, under its former name Ruth & Alex, at the 2014 Toronto International Film Festival. The same year Keaton became the first woman to receive the Golden Lion Award at the Zurich Film Festival.

Keaton's only film of 2015 was Love the Coopers, an ensemble comedy about a troubled family getting together for Christmas, for which she reunited with Because I Said So writer Jessie Nelson. Also starring John Goodman, Ed Helms, and Marisa Tomei, Keaton was attached for several years before the film went into production. Her cast was instrumental in financing and recruiting most other actors, which led her to an executive producer credit in the film. Love the Coopers received largely negative reviews from critics, who called it a "bittersweet blend of holiday cheer", and became a moderate commercial success at a worldwide total of US$41.1million against a budget of US$17million. Also in 2015 Netflix announced the comedy Divanation, for which Keaton was expected to reunite with her First Wives Club co-stars Midler and Hawn to portray a former singing group, but the project failed to materialize.

Keaton voiced amnesiac fish Dory's mother in Disney and Pixar's Finding Dory (2016), the sequel to the 2003 Pixar computer-animated film Finding Nemo. The film was a critical and commercial success, grossing over US$1billion worldwide, the second Pixar film to cross this mark after Toy Story 3 (2010). It also set numerous records, including the biggest animated opening of all time in North America, emerging as the biggest animated film of all time in the US. Keaton's other project of 2016 was the HBO eight-part series The Young Pope, in which she plays a nun who raised the newly elected Pope (Jude Law) and helped him reach the papacy. The miniseries received two nominations for the 69th Primetime Creative Arts Emmy Awards, becoming the first Italian TV series to be nominated for Primetime Emmy Awards.

In 2017 Keaton appeared opposite Brendan Gleeson in the British dramedy film Hampstead. Based on the life of Harry Hallowes, it depicts an American widow (Keaton) who helps a local man defending his ramshackle hut and the life he has been leading on Hampstead Heath for 17 years. The specialty release had a mixed reception from critics, who were unimpressed by the film's "deeply mediocre story", but became a minor commercial success. Keaton's only project of 2018 was Book Club, in which she, Jane Fonda, Candice Bergen, and Mary Steenburgen play four friends who read Fifty Shades of Grey as part of their monthly book club and subsequently begin to change how they view their personal relationships. The romantic comedy received mixed reviews from critics, who felt that Book Club only "intermittently rises to the level of its impressive veteran cast," but with a worldwide gross of over $91 million, became Keaton's biggest commercial success in a non-voice role since 2003's Something's Gotta Give. In 2019, Keaton starred in the comedy Poms as a woman dying of cancer who starts a cheerleading squad with other female residents of a retirement home. The film was a box office disappointment and was negatively received by critics.

Personal life

Relationships and family 
Keaton has had romantic associations with several entertainment industry personalities, starting with director Woody Allen during her role in the 1969 Broadway production of Play It Again, Sam. Their relationship turned romantic following a dinner after a late-night rehearsal. It was her sense of humor that attracted Allen. They briefly lived together during the production, but by the time of the film release of the same name in 1972, their living arrangement became informal. They worked together on eight films between 1971 and 1993, and Keaton has said that Allen remains one of her closest friends.

Keaton also had a relationship with her Godfather Trilogy costar Al Pacino. Their on-again, off-again relationship ended after the filming of The Godfather Part III. Keaton said of Pacino, "Al was simply the most entertaining man... To me, that's, that is the most beautiful face. I think Warren [Beatty] was gorgeous, very pretty, but Al's face is like whoa. Killer, killer face."

Keaton was already dating Warren Beatty in 1979 when they co-starred in the film Reds. Beatty was a regular subject in tabloid magazines and media coverage, and Keaton became included, much to her bewilderment. In 1985, Vanity Fair called her "the most reclusive star since Garbo." This relationship ended shortly after Reds wrapped. Troubles with the production are thought to have strained the relationship, including numerous financial and scheduling problems. Keaton remains friends with Beatty.

In July 2001, Keaton said of being older and unmarried, "I don't think that because I'm not married it's made my life any less. That old maid myth is garbage." Keaton has two adopted children, daughter Dexter (adopted 1996) and son Duke (2001). Her father's death made mortality more apparent to her, and she decided to become a mother at age 50. She later said of having children, "Motherhood has completely changed me. It's just about like the most completely humbling experience that I've ever had."

Religious beliefs 
Keaton said she produced her 1987 documentary Heaven because "I was always pretty religious as a kid ... I was primarily interested in religion because I wanted to go to heaven." When she grew up, she became agnostic.

Other activities 

As of 2023 Keaton has been a vegetarian for 27 years. She has continued to pursue photography. In 1987, she told Vanity Fair, "I have amassed a huge library of images—kissing scenes from movies, pictures I like. Visual things are really key for me." She has published several collections of her photographs and served as an editor of collections of vintage photography. Works she has edited include a book of photographs by paparazzo Ron Galella, an anthology of reproductions of clown paintings, and a collection of photos of California's Spanish-Colonial-style houses.

Keaton has served as a producer on films and television series. She produced the Fox series Pasadena, which was canceled after airing only four episodes in 2001 but completed its run on cable in 2005. In 2003, she produced the Gus Van Sant drama Elephant, about a school shooting. Of why she produced the film, she said, "It really makes me think about my responsibilities as an adult to try and understand what's going on with young people."

Since 2005, Keaton has been a contributing blogger at The Huffington Post. Since 2006, she has been the face of L'Oréal. In 2007, Keaton received the Film Society of Lincoln Center's Gala Tribute. She opposes plastic surgery. She told More magazine in 2004, "I'm stuck in this idea that I need to be authentic ... My face needs to look the way I feel." 

Keaton is active in campaigns with the Los Angeles Conservancy to save and restore historic buildings, particularly in the Los Angeles area. Among the buildings she has been active in restoring is the Ennis House in the Hollywood Hills, designed by Frank Lloyd Wright. Keaton was also active in the failed campaign to save the Ambassador Hotel in Los Angeles (a hotel featured in Reservations), where Robert F. Kennedy was assassinated. She is an enthusiast of Spanish Colonial Revival architecture.

Keaton has also established herself as a real estate developer. She has resold several mansions in Southern California after renovating and redesigning them. One of her clients was Madonna, who purchased a $6.5million Beverly Hills mansion from Keaton in 2003.

Keaton wrote her first memoir, Then Again, for Random House in November 2011. Much of it relies on her mother's private journals, which include the line "Diane...is a mystery...At times, she's so basic, at others so wise it frightens me." In 2012, Keaton's audiobook recording of Joan Didion's Slouching Towards Bethlehem was released on Audible.com. Her performance was nominated for a 2013 Audie Award in the Short Stories/Collections category.

Acting style and legacy 
Keaton has been called "one of the great American actresses from the heyday of the 1970s", a style icon and a "treasure" with a personal and professional style that is "difficult to explicate and impossible to duplicate." Many critics have pointed to her versatility in starring in both light comedies and acclaimed dramas. The New York Times described Keaton as "remarkably skilled" at portraying Woody Allen's "darling flustered muse" in his comedies, as well as "shy, self-conscious women overcome by the power of their own awakened eroticism" in dramatic films like Looking for Mr. Goodbar, Reds, Shoot the Moon and Mrs. Soffel. It also noted Keaton's ability to consistently reinvent and challenge herself on screen, having transitioned from "Allen's ditzy foil" to a "gifted and erotically nuanced character actress" and later "an appealing maternal figure... a woman's woman with a sexy edge."

Literary critic Daphne Merkin argued that Keaton remained more popular with audiences than her contemporaries because of her "friendly accessibility" and "charmingly self-effacing" persona, calling Keaton's most "steadfastly glamorous" asset her "megawatt personality, bursting out of her like an uncontrollable force of nature, a geyser of quirkily entertaining traits that fall on the air and lend everything around her a momentary sparkle." In New York magazine, Peter Rainer wrote, "In her Annie Hall days, [Keaton] was famed for her thrown-together fashion sense, and her approach to acting is, in the best way, thrown-together, too. Audiences love her because they identify with the women she plays, who are never all of a piece. Nobody can be grave and goofy all at once like Diane Keaton. In these fractious times, it's the perfect combo for a modern heroine." Famously self-deprecating, Keaton has been noted for her "wry sense of humor" and "eccentric gender-bending style."

Analyzing her on-screen persona, Deborah C. Mitchell wrote that Keaton often played "a complex, modern American woman, a paradox of self-doubt and assurance", which became her trademark. Mitchell suggests that Keaton made Annie Hall a "critical juncture for women in American culture. In this ism-infected age, Keaton became not just a star but an icon. Annie Hall, and with her Diane Keaton, presented all of the uncertainty and ambivalence of the new breed of women." Likewise, Bruce Weber felt Keaton's eccentricity—"an amalgam of caginess and insecurity" and a "note of comic desperation... her round-cheeked Annie Hall dewiness"—was her gift as a screen comedian. Keaton's Annie Hall is often cited among the greatest Oscar-winning performances in history: Entertainment Weekly ranked it 7th on its "25 greatest Best Actress Winners" list, praising her "loopy mannerisms, jazz-club serenades, and endlessly imitated fashion sense." After seeing her performance in Looking for Mr. Goodbar, Andrew Sarris remarked, "Keaton is clearly the most dynamic woman star in pictures. And any actress who can bring wit and humor to sex in an American movie has to be blessed with the most winning magic."

When asked what made Keaton funny, Allen said: "My opinion is that with the exception of Judy Holliday, she's the finest screen comedienne we've ever seen. It's in her intonation; you can't quantify it easily. When Groucho Marx or W.C. Fields or Holliday would say something, it's in the ring of their voices, and she has that. It's never line comedy with her. It's all character comedy." Charles Shyer, who directed her in Baby Boom, said Keaton was "in the mold of the iconic comedic actresses Carole Lombard, Irene Dunne and Rosalind Russell." In 2017 Keaton was chosen by the board of directors of the American Film Institute to receive the AFI Life Achievement Award, which Woody Allen presented.

Filmography

Film

Television

Music videos

Awards and honors 

Keaton has received various awards, including an Academy Award, and a Golden Globe Award for her performance in Woody Allen's Annie Hall (1977). She also received three more Academy Award nominations, for Reds (1981), Marvin's Room (1996), and Something's Gotta Give (2003). Keaton received a Primetime Emmy Award nomination for Amelia Earhart: The Final Flight (1994) and a Daytime Emmy Award nomination for CBS Schoolbreak Special in 1990. Keaton has received 12 Golden Globe Award nominations, winning for Annie Hall (1977) and Something's Gotta Give (2003). She has received four Screen Actors Guild Award nominations for her work in film and television.

Over the years Keaton has been received various honors for her work as an actress and fashion icon. In 1991, she received the Hasty Pudding Woman of the Year award from Harvard's Hasty Pudding Theatricals, which is given to performers who give a lasting and impressive contribution to the world of entertainment. In 1995, she was honored by the New York Women in Film & Television association along with Angela Bassett, Cokie Roberts, Gena Rowlands and Thelma Schoonmaker. In 1996 she won the Golden Apple Award as the Female Star of the Year, sharing it with her First Wives Club co-stars Goldie Hawn and Bette Midler. She also received the 1997 Crystal Award at the Women in Film Crystal + Lucy Awards in 1997, and the Elle Women in Hollywood Awards the Icon Award in 1998 along with Sigourney Weaver, Lucy Fisher and Gillian Armstrong.

Keaton won the 2004 AFI Star Award during the US Comedy Arts Festival. In 2005, she received a Lifetime Achievement award from the Hollywood Film Awards. She was honored with the Film Society of Lincoln Center Gala Tribute in 2007. In 2014 she received a Lifetime Achievement Award at the Manaki Brothers Film Festival. That year she also received the Golden Icon Award at the Zurich Film Festival. In 2017 she was honored by the American Film Institute and was given a Lifetime Achievement Award, which was presented to her by her close friend and frequent collaborator Woody Allen. Other who paid tribute to her included Steve Martin, Martin Short, Meryl Streep, Reese Witherspoon, Emma Stone, Rachel McAdams, Morgan Freeman, and Al Pacino. In 2018 she received a Special David at the David di Donatello Awards.

Bibliography

As writer 
 Then Again, New York: Random House, 2011, 
 Let's Just Say It Wasn't Pretty, New York: Random House, 2014, 
 Brother & Sister, New York: Random House, 2020

As photographer 
 Reservations, New York: Knopf, 1980, 
 Saved, New York: Rizzoli, 2022,

As editor 
 Still Life (with Marvin Heiferman), New York: Callaway, 1983, 
 Mr. Salesman, Santa Fe: Twin Palms Publishers, 1993, 
 Local News (with Marvin Heiferman), New York: D.A.P./Distributed Art Publishers, Inc., 1999, 
 Clown Paintings, New York: powerHouse Books, 2002, 
 California Romantica, New York: Rizzoli, 2007, 
 House, New York: Rizzoli, 2012,

References

Works cited 
 Lax, Eric. Woody Allen: A Biography (Paperback). . Da Capo Press; Updated edition (December 2000).

External links

 
 
 
 
 
 

1946 births
Living people
20th-century American actresses
21st-century American actresses
20th-century American comedians
21st-century American comedians
21st-century American women writers
American bloggers
American women bloggers
American women comedians
American film actresses
American television actresses
American voice actresses
American photographers
American feminist writers
21st-century American memoirists
American women film producers
Actresses from Los Angeles
American agnostics
AFI Life Achievement Award recipients
Best Actress Academy Award winners
Best Actress BAFTA Award winners
Best Musical or Comedy Actress Golden Globe (film) winners
David di Donatello winners
American music video directors
American television directors
American women film directors
Comedians from California
Female music video directors
Feminist filmmakers
Film directors from California
Film producers from California
Neighborhood Playhouse School of the Theatre alumni
People from Orange County, California
American women memoirists
American women television directors
21st-century American women photographers
21st-century American photographers
American musical theatre actresses
Santa Ana College alumni
Audiobook narrators
Disney people
American women singers